Basking Ridge is an unincorporated community and census-designated place (CDP) located within Bernards Township in the Somerset Hills region of Somerset County, in the U.S. state of New Jersey. As of the 2010 census, the population for the ZIP Code Tabulation Area (ZCTA) 07920 was 26,747.

The area was settled during colonial times. It was home to the old AT&T Headquarters, now operated by Verizon. Basking Ridge is the current headquarters for Collabera, Verizon Wireless, Vencore Labs, Lawyer.com, and Barnes & Noble College Booksellers.

The community of Basking Ridge is part of greater Bernards Township, which also includes the neighborhoods of Liberty Corner, Lyons and West Millington.

History
Basking Ridge was originally settled in the 1720s by British Presbyterians escaping religious persecution. The land was bought from the Lenape Native Americans.

Bernards Township was officially chartered on May 21, 1760 granted by King George II and granted to Sir Francis Bernard, first governor of the noted section which includes Basking Ridge.

On the morning of December 13, 1776, General Charles Lee was captured by the British at Widow White's tavern. Lee had ranked next to Washington in command.

The downtown area of Bernards Township known as Basking Ridge was added to the New Jersey and National Registries as a Historic District. on August 8, 1974.

Demographics

As Basking Ridge is not an independent municipality, demographic data is based on the United States Census Bureau figures for the ZIP Code Tabulation Area (ZCTA) for the 07920 ZIP Code.

2000 census
As of the 2000 United States census there were 24,600 people, 9,300 households, and 6,517 families residing in the ZCTA. The population density was 1,137.1 people per square mile (1830.0/km). There were  9,537 housing units at an average density of 440.8/sq mi (709.3/km). The racial makeup of the ZCTA was 89.2% Caucasian, 1.4% African American, 0.1% Native American, 7.8% Asian, 0.0% Pacific Islander, 0.4% from other races, and 1.1% from two or more races. 2.6% of the population were  Hispanic or Latino of any race.

There were 9,300 households, out of which 37.1% had children under the age of 18 living with them, 62.8% were married couples living together, 5.8% had a female householder with no husband present, and 29.9% were  non-families. 26.5% of all households were  made up of individuals, and 9.1% had someone living alone who was 65 years of age or older. The average household size was 2.56 and the average family size was 3.15.

In the ZCTA the population was spread out, with 27.3% under the age of 18 , 3.2% from 18 to 24 , 31.2% from 25 to 44 , 25.4% from 45 to 64 , and 12.7% who were  65 years of age or older. The median age was 39.3 years.

The median income for a household in the ZCTA was $105,471, and the median income for a family was $131,618. Males had a median income of $93,436 versus $60,101 for females. Out of the total population, 1.2% of those under the age of 18 and 2.8% of those 65 and older were living below the poverty line.

Arts and culture

Cultural events

Basking Ridge has an annual event in May called Charter Day. Many rides are set up in the Oak Street field—a bounce house, inflatable race tracks, and spinning rides. Also, in the center of the town hundreds of stands are set up mostly promoting school sports, but there are also many kettle corn stands, which is a traditional food children eat during Charter Day. At night, the traditional Battle of the Bands takes place, which many teenagers sign up for to play their favorite songs.

Historic sites

Basking Ridge was home to the Old Oak Tree, a 600-year-old white oak, perhaps the oldest white oak in the world. The tree was located on the historic graveyard of the local Presbyterian church. In 2016 the tree showed signs of distress as its upper parts failed to sprout leaves. A big portion of the tree was cut down in 2017 due to decay. The tree has since been cut down as of April 26, 2017.
 A specially designed experimental hospital was built in 1779 by local resident John "Rebel Banker" Morton with the help of Dr. James Tilton in the winter of 1779-80. The hospital was built with three wards, that held patients in its hub and each of the three wards held eight patients. Patient beds were oriented so that their heads were closest to the walls of the buildings. When temperatures fell, a "fire was built in the midst of the ward, without any chimney, and the smoke circulating about, passed off through an opening about 4 inches wide in the ridge of the roof." Tilton described how the design of the building allowed infection to be fought using smoke, "without giving the least offense to the patient, for it always rose above their heads, before it spread abroad in the ward." This hospital, which could accommodate up to 55 patients, provided an uncrowded but fully ventilated space in which those with infectious disease could be kept apart from those who were wounded.
 The Bernards Township Municipal Hall was once owned by the Astors. The estate was built in 1912 by Samuel Owen of Newark, New Jersey. 
The Brick Academy was built in 1809 as the Basking Ridge Classical School; its function was to prepare young men for the College of New Jersey (now known as Princeton University). It has also served as a public school, a union hall, a public library, and the municipal hall for Bernards Township. It now serves as a historic museum for Basking Ridge and as the home of The Historical Society of the Somerset Hills.
The Basking Ridge Presbyterian Church is a Greek Revival church built in 1839 and expanded in 1869, that is listed on the New Jersey Register of Historic Places and added to the National Register of Historic Places on December 31, 1974.

The Warren Kinney Memorial Oak Tree commemorates the life of a well-known dairy farmer and community leader from New Vernon, NJ. According to Mr. Kinney's 1975 obituary, he "helped lead a fight to prevent a jetport from being built on the Great Swamp Wildlife Refuge in Morris County," and was "a founding member of the Madison Square Club, and trustee of the New York Zoological Society."
The Devil's Tree is a solitary oak with some dead limbs growing in an undeveloped field on Mountain Road, opposite Emerald Valley Lane. Local legend, documented in Weird NJ magazine and the book based on it, tells that the tree is cursed or the property of the Devil and has been a site of lynchings by the Ku Klux Klan in the past.
Alward Farm House is a Colonial era farmhouse representing the simple lifestyle of early settlers.  Built c.1740, it is one of the first structures in Bernards Township.  Entered in State and National Registers, 1986.

National Register of Historic Places

Basking Ridge has several properties on the National Register of Historic Places.

Alward Farmhouse, added March 13, 1986
Basking Ridge Classical School, added July 21, 1976
Coffee House, added November 7, 1977
Presbyterian Church in Basking Ridge, added December 31, 1974
Lord Stirling Manor Site, added June 22, 1978
Basking Ridge Historic District, added August 8, 1974.

Parks and recreation
There are several parks within Basking Ridge. Four are county parks: Lord Stirling Park, Rebel Hill, Southard, and Harry Dunham. The fifth is Pleasant Valley Park which contains the town pool and miles of woodchip trails.

Education

Bernards High School was founded by the Bernards Township Board of Education in 1924. When Bernardsville separated from Bernards Township, the schools still remained one system until 1947 when the original high school became the property of Bernardsville. From 1948, however, township students continued attending Bernards High School as tuition students.

William Annin Middle School was originally named after a colonial patriot who settled in Basking Ridge in 1722. Construction started in 1968 and the school was dedicated on September 28, 1969 as William Annin Junior High School and contained grades 6 through 8. The following year it shifted to grades 7 through 9. It became a middle school in 1982.  It currently contains grades 6 through 8. The school is one of the few in the United States to have a seismograph.

There are four elementary schools in Basking Ridge.
Liberty Corner School, was built for a farming community in 1905. It is the oldest school in the district. Part of the original building still remains today. It is located in the Liberty Corner section of Bernards Township.
Oak Street School was built in 1938, although it was completed late. It was dedicated on November 21, 1939 and opened on November 23, the day before Thanksgiving. Dr. Horatio Gates Whitnall originally owned the property on which Oak Street School was built. The land was used for farming and his home was what is now the Summit Bank. Over the years, the population rose rapidly. It serves downtown Basking Ridge which is the area around the Presbyterian Church and the Old Oak Tree.
Cedar Hill School was built 1956. It is situated on land which was once the property of a succession of wealthy families: Owen, Lee, Bissell, and Astor. It was donated in the Mid 1950s by the Lees. It serves the area around William Annin Middle School and Ridge High School.
Mount Prospect was built in 1999. The school was built because a new population rolled in by 2000. Basking Ridge was extended southward and a new subdivision was built: The Hills. Mount Prospect is the newest school in the district and serves the Hills.
The former Maple Avenue School, a two-story, eight classroom structure, was demolished in the 1970s to make room for the current Basking Ridge Public Library.

Transportation

Trains
NJ Transit's Gladstone Branch runs through Basking Ridge. There are two stations that residents can use to get to New York City and Hoboken Terminal:
Basking Ridge: Built in 1912 by the Delaware, Lackawanna and Western Railroad, it serves downtown and north Basking Ridge.
Lyons: Built in 1931 by the Delaware, Lackawanna and Western Railroad, it serves the Hills, and south Basking Ridge in addition to Liberty Corner. Lyons gets more passengers than Basking Ridge.

Buses

Lakeland Bus Lines (Route 78) provides service to and from the Port Authority Bus Terminal in Midtown Manhattan during peak commuting hours.

Roads and highways
Two Interstates are located near Basking Ridge:
Interstate 78: Travel west towards Pennsylvania or east towards New York City and Newark
Interstate 287: Travel north towards upstate New York or south towards Edison.

Notable people

Lord Stirling’s Legacy and his grand Stirling Manor
People who were born in, residents of, or otherwise closely associated with Basking Ridge include:
 John Jacob Astor VI (1912–1992), socialite, shipping businessman and member of the Astor family.
 J. C. Chandor (born 1974), Academy award-nominated writer/director of the 2011 film Margin Call.
 Chris Daggett (born 1950), former regional administrator of the United States Environmental Protection Agency and Commissioner of the New Jersey Department of Environmental Protection who ran for Governor of New Jersey in 2009 as an independent.
 Scott Fischer (1955–1996), climber and guide who was the first American to climb Lhotse, the fourth-highest mountain in the world. He died on May 11, 1996 in an attempt to climb Mount Everest in the 1996 Everest Disaster.
 Patricia Lee Gauch (born 1934), author of over 30 works of children's literature who was inducted into the New Jersey Literary Hall of Fame in 1993.
 Jeff Grace, comedian, screenwriter, film producer, film director and actor, who directed Folk Hero & Funny Guy.
 Jon Gutwillig (born 1974), guitarist of the Disco Biscuits.
 Tobin Heath (born 1988), 2x World Cup Champion and 2x Olympic gold medalist soccer player with the United States women's national team.
 Vincent R. Kramer (1918–2001), United States Marine Corps colonel who was a guerrilla warfare expert and was awarded the Navy Cross during the Korean War.
 Peter Kuhn (1955-2009), race car driver who won both the USAC and SCCA Formula Super Vee championships in 1980.
 Philip Lindsley (1786–1855), Presbyterian minister, educator, and classicist who served as the acting president of the College of New Jersey (now Princeton University) from 1822 to 1824.
 Page McConnell (born 1963), keyboardist best known for his work with Phish.
 Robert E. Mulcahy III (born 1932), former athletic director at Rutgers University.
 Akshay Nanavati (born 1984), United States Marine Corps veteran, speaker, entrepreneur, ultra runner and author of Fearvana.
 Edmund Perry (1825–1878), politician and newspaper publisher, who served as President of the New Jersey Senate from 1861 to 1862
 Jasbir Puar (born 1967), queer theorist, Professor of Women and Gender Studies at Rutgers University and author of The Right to Maim.
 Samuel Lewis Southard (1787–1842), served as U.S. Senator, Secretary of the Navy, and the 10th Governor of New Jersey.
 Meryl Streep (born 1949), multiple Oscar-winning actress
 LaDainian Tomlinson (born 1979), former NFL running back who played for the San Diego Chargers.
 The founding members of punk rock band The Bouncing Souls grew up in Basking Ridge.

References

External links

Basking Ridge History web site
Basking Ridge's most famous resident. Lord Stirling's Legacy and his grand Stirling Manor
The History of Religion in Basking Ridge
Comparing the Basking Ridge Historic Oak to other old trees
Thinking of living in Basking Ridge? Top 10 Reasons
What is Bernards Township Charter Day?
The History of Bernards Twp Municipal Hall - The Astor Estate
History of the Great White Oak Tree in Basking Ridge
Basking Ridge Fire Company No. 1 Website
History of Ridge High School
History of Basking Ridge and Annin Middle School
History of Bowling in the Somerset Hills and Basking Ridge
Meryl Streep was from Basking Ridge
Somerset Hills Most Famous Residents
The Mr. Local History Project - History in Bernards Township

Bernards Township, New Jersey
Buildings and structures on the National Register of Historic Places in New Jersey
National Register of Historic Places in Somerset County, New Jersey
Unincorporated communities in Somerset County, New Jersey
Unincorporated communities in New Jersey